Forcipomyia pluvialis is a species of biting midges (flies in the family Ceratopogonidae).

References

Further reading

 
 

Ceratopogonidae
Articles created by Qbugbot
Insects described in 1923